Rob Friesen (born May 18, 1968) is a Canadian former ice hockey player from Winnipeg, Manitoba.

External links

1968 births
Living people
Abilene Aviators players
Bakersfield Fog players
Canadian ice hockey centres
Canadian people of Norwegian descent
Erie Panthers players
Guildford Flames players
Ice hockey people from Winnipeg
Monroe Moccasins players
Spokane Chiefs players
Wichita Thunder players
Canadian expatriate ice hockey players in England